Archibald "Archie" Casely-Hayford (1898 – 20 August 1977) was a British-trained Ghanaian barrister and politician, who was involved in nationalist politics in the former Gold Coast (present-day Ghana). Having joined the Convention People's Party (CPP), in 1951 he was elected Municipal Member for Kumasi and was appointed by Kwame Nkrumah Minister of Agriculture and Natural Resources in the government of the First Republic. When Nkrumah declared Ghana's Independence on 6 March 1957, he was photographed on the podium flanked by Casely-Hayford, together with Kojo Botsio, Komla Agbeli Gbedemah, Nathaniel Azarco Welbeck and Krobo Edusei.

Biography

Early years and education
Archie Casely-Hayford was born in Axim, Gold Coast, to Beatrice Madelene (née Pinnock) and respected pan-Africanist Joseph Ephraim Casely Hayford. Archie was educated at Mfantsipim School, Cape Coast, and then in Britain at Dulwich College, London. He subsequently studied at Clare College, University of Cambridge, receiving an MA degree in law and economics.

After returning home to the Gold Coast, he practised as a lawyer from 1921 until 1936. He became a member of Sekondi Town Council in 1926, and was made a district magistrate in 1936, rising to be senior district magistrate by 1948, before resuming private legal practice.

National politics
Entering nationalist politics, he joined Kwame Nkrumah's Convention People's Party (CPP), and before the 1951 elections acted as defence counsel for Nkrumah and other CPP leaders, thereby earning the title "Defender of the Verandah Boys". In Nkrumah's first government, Casely-Hayford was appointed Minister of Agriculture and Natural Resources in 1951, and later became Minister of Communications and, in 1954, Minister for the Interior.

Honours
Casely-Hayford was honoured by Ghana with the Grand Medal and was awarded the Queen's Coronation Medal from Britain.

Death and family
At the time of his death, at the Ridge Hospital, Accra, on 20 August 1977, he held the post of Chancellor of the University of Cape Coast. In the years prior, he also had been serving as the head of the wider Casely-Hayford family. His eldest son Beattie Casely-Hayford became the first director of the Ghana Arts Council, and his other son Louis Casely-Hayford was a chartered engineer who served as CEO of the Volta River Authority.

References

External links
 Marc Woons, "Inspiring Visit to Kwame Nkrumah Memorial Park" – includes Independence Day photograph.

1898 births
1977 deaths
Archie
20th-century Ghanaian lawyers
Agriculture ministers of Ghana
Alumni of Clare College, Cambridge
Communications ministers of Ghana
Convention People's Party (Ghana) politicians
Fante people
Ghanaian Methodists
Ghanaian MPs 1951–1954
Ghanaian MPs 1954–1956
Ghanaian MPs 1956–1965
Ghanaian people of English descent
Ghanaian people of Irish descent
Interior ministers of Ghana
Mfantsipim School alumni
People educated at Dulwich College